All Hail King Julien is a computer-animated television series featuring characters from the DreamWorks Animation animated film Madagascar. The show stars King Julien (Danny Jacobs), the lemur from the Madagascar franchise, and tells the story of his life in Madagascar before the events of the first film.

During the course of the series, 78 episodes of All Hail King Julien were released over five seasons, with the separate season being subtitled Exiled.

Series overview

Episodes

Season 1 (2014–15)
The series premiered on December 19, 2014, when were released the first five 22-minute episodes. They were followed by a second batch of five episodes on April 3, 2015.

Season 2 (2015)

Season 3 (2016)

Season 4 (2016)

Exiled (2017)

Season 5 (2017)

References

External links
All Hail King Julien Official website
All Hail King Julien: Exiled Official website

Lists of American children's animated television series episodes